General elections were held in Kuwait on 23 January 1963. A total of 205 candidates contested the 50 seats, with pro-government candidates emerging as the largest bloc. Voter turnout was 85.0%.

Results

References

Kuwait
General election
Elections in Kuwait
Non-partisan elections